Schönberg im Stubaital is a municipality in the district of Innsbruck-Land, Tyrol, Austria. The village was mentioned as “Schönenberge” for the first time in 1180.

Population

References

External links

Cities and towns in Innsbruck-Land District